The Men's high jump athletics events for the 2020 Summer Paralympics took place at the Tokyo National Stadium from August 29 to September 3, 2021. A total of 3 events were contested in this discipline.

Schedule

Medal summary
The following is a summary of the medals awarded across all high jump events.

Results

T47

Records

Prior to this competition, the existing world, Paralympic, and area records were as follows:

Results

The final in this classification took place on 29 August 2021:

T63

Records
Prior to this competition, the existing world, Paralympic and area records were as follows:

Results

The final in this classification took place on 31 August 2021, at 19:25:

T64

Records

Prior to this competition, the existing world, Paralympic, and area records were as follows:

Results

The final in this classification took place on 3 September 2021, at 11:02:

References

Athletics at the 2020 Summer Paralympics
2021 in men's athletics